Iton is a river in Normandy, France, left tributary of the river Eure. Its source is near Moulins-la-Marche. For about 10 km between Orvaux and Glisolles, it disappears and pursues a subterranean course.

The Iton flows through the following départements and towns:

Orne: Crulai, Chandai
Eure: Bourth, Damville, La Bonneville-sur-Iton, Évreux

It flows into the Eure in Acquigny, south of Louviers.

Its basin (1,300 km²) covers 134 communes and is subject to a schéma d'aménagement et de gestion des eaux (water management scheme).

References

External links

Avancement des SAGE du bassin Seine-Normandie SAGE on the Seine-Normandy basin (in French)

Rivers of France
Rivers of Eure
Rivers of Orne
Rivers of Normandy